Jonas Søndberg Thorsen (born 19 April 1990) is a Danish professional footballer who plays as a right-back for Danish 1st Division club SønderjyskE.

Club career

AGF
In 2008, he was on trial with Austrian powerhouse Red Bull Salzburg, where the later head-coach of Viborg FF, Lars Søndergaard, was leading the club's talents. Thorsen signed with Viborg FF in August 2009 after spending a season partly with AGF reserves, and since January 2009 on a professional contract.

Viborg FF
At the age of 19, Thorsen signed with Viborg FF on 31 August 2009. He left the club after eight years in the summer 2017.

AC Horsens
On 21 June 2017, Thorsen signed for AC Horsens on a free transfer.

In July 2019, he returned to AC Horsens after one year in Germany with Eintracht Braunschweig. In late 2020, Thorsen underwent surgery for testicular cancer and was subsequently declared healthy. However, the cancer returned in July 2021,after which he started chemotherapy again.  For this reason, Thorsen did not play much in the 2021-22 season, just as he left the club after the season when his contract expired.

Return to Viborg
On 12 July 2022, after training with the team for a couple of days, it was confirmed, that Thorsen had signed a one-year deal with his former club Viborg FF.

SønderjyskE
On transfer deadline day, 31 January 2023, Thorsen joined Danish 1st Division club SønderjyskE on a deal for the rest of the season.

References

External links

1990 births
Living people
People from Aarhus Municipality
Danish men's footballers
Association football fullbacks
AC Horsens players
Viborg FF players
Aarhus Gymnastikforening players
Eintracht Braunschweig players
SønderjyskE Fodbold players
Danish Superliga players
Danish 1st Division players
3. Liga players
Danish expatriate men's footballers
Expatriate footballers in Germany
Danish expatriate sportspeople in Germany
Denmark youth international footballers
Sportspeople from the Central Denmark Region